Chuzhou or Chu Prefecture (楚州) was a zhou (prefecture) in imperial China seated in modern Huai'an, Jiangsu, China. It existed (intermittently) from 581 to 1228.

Geography
The administrative region of Chuzhou in the Tang dynasty is in modern Jiangsu. It probably includes parts of modern: 
 Under the administration of Huai'an:
Huai'an
Xuyi County
Jinhu County
Hongze County
Under the administration of Yangzhou:
Baoying County
Under the administration of Yancheng:
Jianhu County

References
 

Prefectures of the Sui dynasty
Prefectures of the Tang dynasty
Prefectures of the Song dynasty
Prefectures of Yang Wu
Prefectures of Southern Tang
Prefectures of Later Zhou
Former prefectures in Jiangsu